Belchertown High School is public high school located in Belchertown, Massachusetts. The school is home to grades 9 through 12.

History
Belchertown High School's building is on Springfield Road and was first used in the 2002–2003 school year. The high school used to be on North Washington Street, in the building which is now the Jabish Brook Middle School. The principal is Christine M. Vigneux, who is assisted by Mr. Robert Marchewka, the Vice Principal.

The high school's motto is "The Belchertown High School educational community fosters academic excellence and responsible citizenship in a positive, safe, and respectful environment in order to develop productive contributors to society."

In 2010, the world's largest Twister mat was placed on the Belchertown High campus.

Music
Belchertown High School's music program includes nine musical groups and ensembles  including a Concert Band (9th & 10th grade students), Symphony Band (11th & 12th grade students), Wind Ensemble, Jazz Band, Percussion Ensemble 1, Percussion Ensemble 2, Marching Band, Concert Choir, and a Women's Choir. The band program has won numerous gold medals (the highest medal awarded) at MICCA, which is a high school band competition in Massachusetts. The choir program has also won numerous awards.

In 2012, the school's marching band, the Marching Orioles, performed in the Main Street Electrical Parade at Disney World's Magic Kingdom in Orlando, Florida.  On the same trip, the Belchertown High School Wind Ensemble, Symphony Band, and Concert Band competed in the Orlando World Strides Heritage Festival and received numerous awards.

The Director of Bands was Lyndsay Boysen from 2008 to 2014, Dr. Brian Messier from 2014 to 2019. Ryan Caster has been the Director of Bands since Fall of 2019. The choir director is Susan Comstock. In the 2013–2014 school year, the program included more than 160 students.

Athletics
Belchertown High School's athletic programs include football, basketball, baseball, hockey, cross country, golf, tennis, lacrosse, swimming, track-and-field, field hockey and soccer teams. The boys soccer team won the Massachusetts Division 3 State Championship during Fall 2013 and Fall 2019.

Gallery

See also
List of high schools in Massachusetts

References

External links

Schools in Hampshire County, Massachusetts
Public high schools in Massachusetts
School buildings completed in 2002
2002 establishments in Massachusetts